A Roman dodecahedron or Gallo-Roman dodecahedron is a small hollow object made of copper alloy which has been cast into a regular dodecahedral shape: twelve flat pentagonal faces, each face having a circular hole of varying diameter in the middle, the holes connecting to the hollow center. Roman dodecahedra date from the 2nd to 4th centuries AD and their purpose remains unknown. They rarely show signs of wear, and do not have any inscribed numbers or letters.

History

The first dodecahedron was found in 1739. Since then, at least 116 similar objects have been found in Austria, Belgium, France, Germany, Hungary, Luxembourg, the Netherlands, Switzerland and the United Kingdom. A Roman icosahedron has also been discovered after having long been misclassified as a dodecahedron. This icosahedron was excavated near Arloff in Germany and is currently on display in the Rheinisches Landesmuseum in Bonn.

Purpose 
No mention of dodecahedrons has been found in contemporary accounts or pictures of the time. Speculative uses include as a survey instrument for estimating distances to (or sizes of) distant objects, though this is questioned as there are no markings to indicate that they would be a mathematical instrument; as spool knitting devices for making gloves, though the earliest known reference to spool knitting is from 1535; as part of a child's toy, or for decorative purposes. Several dodecahedra were found in coin hoards, providing evidence that their owners either considered them valuable objects, or believed their only use was connected with coins. It has been suggested that they might have been religious artifacts, or even fortune-telling devices. This latter speculation is based on the fact that most of the examples have been found in Gallo-Roman sites. It has also been suggested that they might have been an object to test the skill of a metalsmith, perhaps as part of a portfolio to demonstrate their capabilities to customers or as a way to qualify for a certain status in a collegium (guild). This speculation is based on the historic cost of bronze and the level of skill necessary to cast such an object. Some 19th century antiquarians speculated that they might be weapons, such as the head of a mace or a metal bullet, but other scholars have suggested that the dodecahedrons are too light to make for an effective weapon.

Similar objects
Smaller dodecahedra with the same features (holes and knobs) and made from gold have been found in South-East Asia along the Maritime Silk Road and the earliest items appear to be from the Roman epoch. Examples include those uncovered in Óc Eo by Louis Malleret, who concluded that the objects represented Mediterranean influence on Funan by trade. Similar decorative gold dodecahedrons have been found in the Pyu city-states and Khao Sam Kaeo.

References

External links

 "History Mystery: Ancient Dodecahedron's Purpose Remains Secret" by Alexandria Hein, Fox News, June 10, 2011

Archaeological artefact types
Dodecahedron
Platonic solids
1739 archaeological discoveries